A vanishing twin, also known as twin resorption, is a fetus in a multigestation pregnancy that dies in utero and is then partially or completely reabsorbed. In some instances, the dead twin is compressed into a flattened, parchment-like state known as fetus papyraceus.

Vanishing twins occur in up to one of every eight multifetus pregnancies and may not even be known in most cases. "High resorption rates, which cannot be explained on the basis of the expected abortion rate, suggest intense fetal competition for space, nutrition, or other factors during early gestation, with frequent loss or resorption of the other twin(s)."

In pregnancies achieved by in vitro fertilization, "it frequently happens that more than one amniotic sac can be seen in early pregnancy, whereas a few weeks later there is only one to be seen and the other has 'vanished'".

See also 
 Chimera (genetics)
 Mosaicism
 Parasitic twin

References

Further reading

External links 

Vanishing twin at eMedicine.com
50 articles about vanishing twin phenomenon in PubMed

Twin
Pregnancy with abortive outcome